A statue of Christopher Columbus by Mario Zamora was installed in Chula Vista, California's Discovery Park, in the United States.  The statue has been vandalized multiple times. It was removed and placed into storage in June 2020.

The statue was installed in 1991 as part of the Columbus Quincentenary. It was surveyed by the Smithsonian Institution's "Save Outdoor Sculpture!" program in 1993.

Description
The memorial depicts Christopher Columbus with his arms crossed over his chest and holding a telescope. The bronze sculpture measures approximately 6 x 3 x 2 ft and rests on a 6-ft tall granite base with a 6-ft diameter. A plaque reads: "Columbus found a world, and had no chart / save one that faith deciphered in the skies / to trust the soul's invincible surmise / was all his science and his only art / George Santayana / Dedicated to the people of Chula Vista by the Rancho Del Rey partnership / a joint venture between McMillin Communities and Home Capital".

See also

 List of monuments and memorials removed during the George Floyd protests
 List of monuments and memorials to Christopher Columbus

References

Bronze sculptures in California
Buildings and structures in Chula Vista, California
Monuments and memorials in California
Monuments and memorials removed during the George Floyd protests
Outdoor sculptures in California
Relocated buildings and structures in California
Sculptures of men in California
Chula Vista, California
Vandalized works of art in California
Statues removed in 2020